Amir Aliýewiç Gurbani (born 24 October 1987) is a professional Turkmen football player currently playing for Ahal FK in the Ýokary Liga.

Career 
In February 2012, passed in watching the football club Buxoro FK and even signed a long-term contract, but two months later left the club, according to Gurbani reason for his departure were family problems

In 2013 with FC Balkan he won the AFC-President´s Cup 2013 in Malaysia, received an award tournament’s eventual MVP.

In 2014 moved to FC Ahal. In 2015 returned to FC Balkan.

In 2016 Gurbani returned to Altyn Asyr FK.

In December 2017, Gurbani joined FC Dordoi Bishkek.

National team 
He played for the Olympic team of Turkmenistan at the Asian Games 2010 in Guangzhou.

Gurbani made his debut for the Turkmenistan senior national team in 2011, match against India at 2012 AFC Challenge Cup qualification.

Personal life
Gurbani is of Persian origin. Son of a famous football player Köpetdag Aşgabat in the past Ali Gurbani.

Achievements 
Balkan
 AFC President's Cup: 2013

References

External links

1987 births
Living people
Turkmenistan footballers
FC Ahal players
FK Köpetdag Aşgabat players
FC Aşgabat players
FC Altyn Asyr players
FC Dordoi Bishkek players
New Radiant S.C. players
Nagaworld FC players
Turkmenistan international footballers
Association football forwards
Sportspeople from Ashgabat
Footballers at the 2010 Asian Games
Turkmenistan people of Iranian descent
Asian Games competitors for Turkmenistan
Turkmenistan expatriate footballers
Expatriate footballers in Cambodia
Expatriate footballers in the Maldives
Expatriate footballers in Kyrgyzstan